Curtis is a very small lunar impact crater that lies in the western Mare Crisium, to the east of the crater Picard. It is a circular, cup-shaped formation that is otherwise undistinguished. It was named after American astronomer Heber D. Curtis in 1973. In the past it was designated Picard Z.

References

External links

 LTO-62A2 Curtis — L&PI topographic map

Impact craters on the Moon